Christopher John Boyce (born 16 February 1953) is a former American defense industry employee who was convicted of selling United States spy satellite secrets to the Soviet Union in the 1970s.

Early life
Boyce is the son of Noreen Boyce (née Hollenbeck) and former McDonnell Douglas Aircraft Corporation Director of Security Charles Eugene Boyce. Along with his three brothers and five sisters, Boyce was reared in Southern California, in the affluent community of Rancho Palos Verdes, a suburb southwest of Los Angeles.

In 1974, Boyce was hired at TRW, an aerospace firm in Redondo Beach, California. Due to his father's position at McDonnell Douglas, Boyce was able to obtain employment.

Espionage
Within months, Boyce was promoted to a highly sensitive position in TRW's "Black Vault" (classified communications center) with a top secret security clearance, where he worked with National Reconnaissance Office (NRO) transmissions.

Boyce claims that he began getting misrouted cables from the Central Intelligence Agency (CIA) discussing the agency's desire to depose the government of Prime Minister Gough Whitlam in Australia. Boyce claimed the CIA wanted Whitlam removed from office because he wanted to close U.S. military bases in Australia, including the vital Pine Gap secure communications facility, and withdraw Australian troops from Vietnam. For these reasons, John Pilger, Australian journalist and author, has written that U.S. government pressure was a major factor in the dismissal of Whitlam as Prime Minister by the Governor General, Sir John Kerr, who according to Boyce, was referred to as "our man Kerr" by CIA officers. Through the cable traffic Boyce saw that the CIA was involving itself in such a manner, not just with Australia but with other democratic, industrialized allies. Boyce considered going to the press, but believed the media's earlier disclosure of CIA involvement in the 1973 Chilean coup d'état had not changed anything for the better.

Instead, he gathered a quantity of classified documents concerning secure U.S. communications ciphers and spy satellite development and had his friend Andrew Daulton Lee, a cocaine and heroin dealer since his high school days (hence his nickname, "The Snowman"), deliver them to Soviet embassy officials in Mexico City, returning with large sums of cash for Boyce (nicknamed "The Falcon" because of his longtime interest in falconry) and himself. According to a book that Boyce and his wife co-authored, the information was not valuable to the Soviet Union.

Exposure
Boyce, then 23, was finally exposed after Lee was arrested by Mexican police in front of the Soviet embassy on 6 January 1977. His arrest was "almost by accident": Lee was arrested for littering. During his harsh interrogation, Lee, who had top secret microfilm in his possession when arrested, confessed to being a Soviet spy and implicated Boyce. Boyce was arrested ten days later on 16 January, when the FBI found him hiding out at the shack he was renting near Riverside, California. He was convicted on eight counts of espionage on 28 April 1977, and sentenced by federal district judge Robert Kelleher on 12 September to forty years in prison, initially at Terminal Island, then the Metropolitan Correctional Center in San Diego. On 10 July 1979, he was transferred to the federal penitentiary in Lompoc, California.

Escape
On 21 January 1980, Boyce escaped from Lompoc. While a fugitive, Boyce carried out 17 bank robberies in Idaho and Washington, hoping to pay for passage to the Soviet Union, and adopted the alias of "Anthony Edward Lester."

According to Boyce, he studied aviation, not to flee to the Soviet Union as some suspected, but to rescue Daulton Lee from Lompoc.

On 21 August 1981, Boyce was arrested by U.S. Marshals while eating in his car outside "The Pit Stop," a drive-in restaurant in Port Angeles, Washington. Authorities had received a tip about Boyce's whereabouts from his former bank robbery confederates.

Return to prison
In the spring of 1982, Boyce appeared before Judge Harold Ryan in U.S. District Court in Boise and was sentenced to three years for his escape and 25 years for bank robbery, conspiracy, and breaking federal gun laws. Given an aggregate total sentence of 68 years, he was transferred to United States Penitentiary, Leavenworth.

Later that year, Boyce gave a television interview to Ray Martin for Australia's 60 Minutes about the dismissal of Whitlam. After this he was assaulted by fellow inmates, an attack he believed was orchestrated by prison guards. After the attack, he was transferred to USP Marion, where he was held in isolation.

In April 1985, Boyce gave testimony on how to prevent insider spy threats to the Senate Permanent Subcommittee on Investigations as part of its Government Personnel Security Program.

In 1988, with support from senators, he was transferred, out of solitary confinement, to Minnesota Correctional Facility – Oak Park Heights. He was transferred to ADX Florence in Colorado in 1998; in his opinion, this was punishment for a newspaper article that he had written. In 2000, he was transferred to FCI Sheridan in Oregon, northwest of Salem.

Release and subsequent life
Boyce was released from prison on parole on 16 September 2002 after serving a little more than 25 years, accounting for his time spent outside from the escape. Shortly thereafter he married Kathleen Mills, whom he had met when she was working as a paralegal spearheading efforts to obtain parole for Lee. After her success with Lee, she turned her attention to securing parole for Boyce as well, and the two developed a personal relationship. Boyce is on good terms with his father and eight siblings, and was with his mother as well until her death in 2017.

In 2013, Boyce published a book titled American Sons: The Untold Story of the Falcon and the Snowman, which mainly discusses his time in prison and relationship with his wife, Kathleen, and writer Vince Font. At that time, he was living a relatively quiet life where he has resumed his participation in falconry as a frequent pastime. When interviewed at the time his book was released, Boyce expressed support for the actions of Edward Snowden in exposing information about the United States government's surveillance programs.

In popular culture
The story of their case was told in Robert Lindsey's best-selling 1979 book The Falcon and the Snowman. This book was turned into a film of the same title in 1985 by director John Schlesinger starring Timothy Hutton as Boyce and Sean Penn as Lee.

Lindsey's initial book was followed by The Flight of the Falcon: The True Story of the Escape and Manhunt for America's Most Wanted Spy (1983), an account of Boyce's escape from prison and subsequent bank robbing spree.

See also 
Alleged CIA involvement in the Whitlam Dismissal

References

Further reading
 Statement by Peter Staples, Member for Jagajaga in Australia, 20 November 1986
 Robert Lindsey, The Falcon and the Snowman: A True Story of Friendship and Espionage, Lyons Press, 1979, 
 Robert Lindsey, The Flight of the Falcon: The True Story of the Escape and Manhunt for America's Most Wanted Spy, Simon & Schuster, 1983, 
 Christopher Boyce, Cait Boyce, Vince Font, American Sons: The Untold Story of the Falcon and the Snowman, Glass Spider Publishing, 2013/2017,

External links

American Sons: The Untold Story of the Falcon and The Snowman book and blog website
CodenameFalcon on Twitter
Chris Boyce and Daulton Lee in the TruTV Crime Library
Chris "The Falcon" Boyce episode on The Dollop Podcast

1953 births
American bank robbers
American escapees
American people convicted of spying for the Soviet Union
American spies
Escapees from United States federal government detention
Fugitives
Living people
People convicted under the Espionage Act of 1917
Place of birth missing (living people)